The 2015 NPF College Draft is the twelfth annual collegiate draft for NPF, and was held on Wednesday, April 1, 2015, 5:30 pm CST at the CMA Theater in the Country Music Hall of Fame and Museum in Nashville, Tennessee. Draft order was determined by regular season standings from 2014, but subsequent trades and transactions altered the overall draft order.  The draft was broadcast live on CBS Sports Network

The Draft
With the addition of the Dallas Charge, a league expansion team in 2015, the Draft has added a 6th round and four additional bonus selections for Dallas. Dallas was given bonus selections in the fourth and sixth rounds for a total of 10 selections. The additional round and selections will total 34 overall picks in the 2015 Draft.  However, Dallas chose to exercise a previous option offered to them, and made a “Market Choice Selection.”  Exercising their Market Choice Selection allowed Dallas Charge to choose a player either originally from the state of Texas or who played college softball for a Texas school.  Exercising the Market Choice Selection reduced the overall number of Draft picks for Dallas to nine instead of the original ten. The 34th was replaced by the Market Choice Selection by Dallas. A trade of draft picks with the USSSA Pride brought Dallas' total back to ten draft selections.

Drafting an athlete gives an NPF affiliate team the rights to that athlete for two full seasons.

Draft Selections 

Position key: 
C = catcher; INF = infielder; SS = shortstop; OF = outfielder; UT = Utility infielder; P = pitcher; RHP = right-handed pitcher; LHP = left-handed pitcher
Positions will be listed as combined for those who can play multiple positions.

Round 1

Round 2

Round 3

Round 4

Round 5

Round 6

Draft notes

Round 1:

Round 2:

Round 3:

Round 4:

Round 5:

References 

2015 in softball
National Pro Fastpitch drafts
Softball in the United States
Softball teams